Andy Hui Chi-on (born 12 August 1967) is a Hong Kong singer and actor. Hui is considered one of the most successful Hong Kong singers, with an extensive list of Cantonese and Mandarin hits to his credit.

Early life
Hui's mother is Vietnamese. He was transferred to Confucian Tai Shing Primary School because his previous school forced him to perform tasks right-handed when he was born left-handed.

Career
Hui was the first runner-up in the fifth Annual New Talent Singing Awards in 1986. Hui has appeared in more than 25 films.

His first music contract came in 1986, and his singing career reached stellar status in 2001 as he won awards of the most favourite male singer.

In 2004, Hui was named by Alan Tam as one of the 'New Four Heavenly Kings' along with Hacken Lee, Leo Ku, and Edmond Leung which would be replacing the once lustrous title awarded to Jacky Cheung, Andy Lau, Aaron Kwok, and Leon Lai.

In October 2005, Andy was declared one of Ten Outstanding Young Persons where his hard work on his music and film career, and his excellence in commitment to the community was recognized.

Personal life
Hui married singer-actress Sammi Cheng in 2013.

On April 16, 2019, a video of Hui being intimate with former HK Pageant contestant and TVB actress Jacqueline Wong during a taxi ride was released. The incident was recorded by the taxi's in-vehicle camera. Hui made a public apology to his wife and loved ones, citing he was drunk that night but admitted his intoxication was no excuse for his behaviour. Wong's image and career was adversely affected but Hui was able to restart his career and saved his marriage after the scandal.

Discography 

 5 May 1988: Andy Hui
 1988: Love Fragments / Shang De Che Di
 1989: Andy Hui 1989
 March 1990: Andy Hui 1990
 March 1991: Break and Reform Collection
 January 1992: Alive! 
 January 1993: Loving You
 July 1993: Sunshine After The Rain
 December 1993: Never Love Like This 
 1994: Xiang Shuo (想說)
 June 1994: Unique
 6 December 1994: Heart
 1994: Unless You Tell Me
 1995: Paradise Lost
 1996: Nan Ren Zui Tong (男人最痛)
 1997: Man's Emotion
 1997: Ai De Xing Ku Xin Jiu Dui Zhao 17 Shou (New Song + Collection) (愛的辛苦新舊對照十七首)
 1997: Yi Qie An Hao Xin Jiu Dui Zhao 17 Shou (New Mandarin Song + Best Selection)
 1997: My Day, My Song
 1997: Kan Qing Chu (看清楚) – Mandarin CD
 1998: Fei De Qi (飛得起)
 1998: First, Second, Third, Fourth – Mandarin Album
 1998: Good Andy Hui 98 Concert
 1999: Faith With Heart
 1999: Andy Hui 99 Live in Concert
 1999: Faith in Love
 1999: The End of 20th Century Collection
 1999: We Want Happiness
 1999: Sound And Vision 46 Collection
 January 2000: Believe in Love
 2000: Shang Ci (上次)
 2001: You Xian Yong Bao (優先擁抱) – Cantonese Album
 2001: This One Second, Is it you, OK? – Mandarin Album
 2001: Mud (Laan nai) – Cantonese Album
 2002: Wo Hai Neng Ai Shei (我還能愛誰) – Mandarin Album
 2002: Roma – Cantonese Album
 December 2002: On Hits (New + Best Selections)
 August 2003: My Story
 January 2004: Life in Music (New + Best Selections)
 February 2004: Couldn't Be Better
 29 October 2004: Back Up
 February 2005: Encore Concert (安哥對唱音樂會)
 May 2005: First Round Concert (第一回合演唱會)
 November 2005: Cantonese New + Best Collection (大風吹 – 廣東新歌+精選三十首)
 2005: Xiang Ai Duo Nian (相愛多年) – (New Mandarin Song + Best Selection)
 September 2006: In The Name of...
 2007: Kong Qian Jue Hou (空前絕後)
 2009: Zi Dao / Zi Chuan (自導／自傳) – (New Song + Selection)
 2009: Ge Ren (歌人) – Mandarin CD
 May 2011: On and On
 2014: New Heaven
 2015: Come on Enjoy The Best (New Song + Selection)
 2017: 18 Ounces

Filmography

 Girls Without Tomorrow 1992 (1992)
 First Shot (1993)
 Future Cops (1993)
 Tequila (1993) 
 Cop Image (1994) 
 Wonder Seven (1994) 
 Mack the Knife (1995) 
 Happy Hour (1995) 
 Who's the Woman, Who's the Man (1996) [cameo] 
 Mystery Files (1996) 
 Swallowtail Butterfly (1996)
 Feel 100%...Once More (1996) 
 Love Amoeba Style (1997) 
 Ah Fai the Dumb (1997) 
 Love is not a game, but a joke (1997) 
 A Love Story (1998) 
 Marooned (2000) 
 Nightmares in Precinct 7 (2001) 
 Killing End (2001) 
 Interactive Murders (2002) 
 The Monkey King: Quest for the Sutra (2002) 
 Give Them a Chance (2002) 
 Sex and the Beauties (2004) 
 Koma (2004)
 Six Strong Guys (2004)
 To Grow With Love (Lush Field Happy Event) (2006)
 Silence (2006)
 Dressage to Win (2008)
 ICAC Investigators 2009 (2009)
 Claustrophobia (2009)
 Split Second murders (2009)
 72 Tenants of Prosperity (2010)
 Summer Love Love (2011)
 A Big Deal (2011)
 I Love Hong Kong 2012 (2012)
 Nessun Dorma (2016)

References

External links 
 Andy Hui blog (www.andyhui.asia)
 
 Andy Hui on chinesemov.com

1967 births
Living people
Big Four (band) members
Cantopop singers
Hong Kong Christians
Hong Kong evangelicals
Hong Kong male film actors
Hong Kong male singers
Hong Kong male television actors
New Talent Singing Awards contestants
TVB actors
20th-century Hong Kong male actors
21st-century Hong Kong male actors
Hong Kong Mandopop singers
Hong Kong people of Vietnamese descent